The Australian indie rock band Lowtide's discography, as of 2017, currently consists of 1 studio album and extended play; five singles, of which 2 have B-sides and 4 music videos.

Albums

Studio albums

Extended plays

Singles

Music videos

References 

Discographies of Australian artists
Rock music group discographies